is a passenger railway station in the city of Funabashi, Chiba, Japan, operated by the third sector railway operator Tōyō Rapid Railway.

Lines
Funabashi-Nichidaimae Station is a station on the Tōyō Rapid Railway Line, and is 9.8 km from the starting point of the line at Nishi-Funabashi Station.

Station layout 
The station is an underground station with two opposed side platforms with the station building located at ground level.

Platforms

History
Funabashi-Nichidaimae Station was opened on April 27, 1996. The East Exit to the station was completed in 2004.

Passenger statistics
In fiscal 2018, the station was used by an average of 10,157 passengers daily.

Surrounding area
Funabashi Arena
Nihon University Funabashi Campus (Faculty of Science and Engineering, Graduate School of Science and Engineering)
 Nihon University Faculty of Pharmaceutical Sciences Campus (Faculty of Pharmaceutical Sciences, Graduate School of Pharmaceutical Sciences)
 Nihon University College of Science Funabashi Campus
 Nihon University Narashino High School

See also
 List of railway stations in Japan

References

External links

 Tōyō Rapid Railway Station information 

Railway stations in Japan opened in 1996
Railway stations in Chiba Prefecture
Funabashi